The 1982 Supertaça Cândido de Oliveira was the 4th edition of the Supertaça Cândido de Oliveira, the annual Portuguese football season-opening match contested by the winners of the previous season's top league and cup competitions (or cup runner-up in case the league- and cup-winning club is the same). The 1982 Supertaça Cândido de Oliveira was contested over two legs, and opposed Braga and Sporting CP of the Primeira Liga. Sporting CP qualified for the SuperCup by winning the 1981–82 Primeira Divisão and the 1981–82 Taça de Portugal, whilst Braga qualified for the Supertaça as the cup runners-up.

The first leg which took place at the Estádio Primeiro de Maio, saw 2–1 victory for Braga. The second leg which took place at the Estádio José Alvalade, saw the Leões defeat Os Arsenalistas 6–1 (7–3 on aggregate) to claim their first Supertaça.

First leg

Details

Second leg

Details

References

Supertaça Cândido de Oliveira
Super
S.C. Braga matches
Sporting CP matches